The Neira Province is  a subregion of the Colombian Department of Boyacá. The subregion is formed by 6 municipalities. The province is named after Juan Nepomuceno Neira.

Municipalities 
Chinavita • Garagoa • Macanal • Pachavita • San Luis de Gaceno • Santa María

References

External links 
  Boyaca Info; Provinces of Boyaca

Provinces of Boyacá Department